Israel competed at the 2009 World Aquatics Championships in Rome, Italy from 26 July to 2 August.

Open water swimming

Swimming

Men

Women

Synchronized swimming

 Legend: (R) = Reserve Athlete

References

Nations at the 2009 World Aquatics Championships
2009
2009 in Israeli sport